Materiel refers to supplies, equipment, and weapons in military supply-chain management, and typically supplies and equipment in a commercial supply chain context.

In a military context, the term materiel refers either to the specific needs (excluding manpower) of a force to complete a specific mission, or the general sense of the needs (excluding manpower) of a functioning army.

An important category of materiel is commonly referred to as ordnance, especially concerning mounted guns (artillery) and the shells it consumes. Along with fuel, and munitions in general, the steady supply of ordnance is an ongoing logistic challenge in active combat zones. 

Materiel management consists of continuing actions relating to planning, organizing, directing, coordinating, controlling, and evaluating the application of resources to ensure the effective and economical support of military forces. It includes provisioning, cataloging, requirements determination, acquisition, distribution, maintenance, and disposal. The terms "materiel management", "materiel control", "inventory control", "inventory management", and "supply management" are synonymous.

Military materiel is often shipped to and used in severe climates without controlled warehouses or fixed material handling equipment.  Packaging and labeling often need to meet stringent technical specifications to help ensure proper delivery and final use.  Some military procurement allows for commercial packaging rather than the more stringent military grades.

Materiel in the commercial distribution context refers to the products of the business, as distinct from those involved in operating the business itself.

See also

 Anti-materiel rifle
 Inventory
 Matériel (French Army)
 Military acquisition
 Military logistics
 Military supply chain management
 Supply chain
 United States Army Materiel Command
 Air Force Materiel Command
 United States Army Medical Research and Materiel Command

References

External links 
 

Freight transport
Military logistics